The 22903/22904 Bandra (T)–Bhuj AC Superfast Express (Ashapura Express) is a Superfast Express train belonging to Indian Railways that runs between Bandra Terminus and . It is a 3 times a week service. It operates as train number 22903 from Bandra Terminus to Bhuj and as train number 22904 in the reverse direction.

Coaches

Bandra (T)–Bhuj AC Superfast Express has 1 AC 1st Class, 4 AC 2 tier, 9 AC 3 tier coaches. The rake is composed of Old Rajdhani Express ICF rakes and has a set of EOG cars at either end. As with most train services in India, coach composition may be amended at the discretion of Indian Railways depending on demand.

Service

Bandra (T)–Bhuj AC Superfast Express covers the distance of 839 km in 12 hours 55 minutes as 22903 Bandra (T)–Bhuj AC Superfast Express averaging 62.93 km/hr and 13 hours 20 mins as 22904 Bhuj–Bandra (T) AC Superfast Express averaging 60.65 km/hr.

Route and halts

The important halts of the train are:

Traction

As Western Railway switched over to AC system in February 2012, it is hauled by a WAP-5 engine from the Vadodara shed until  after which a Vatva-based WDM-3A takes over until Bhuj. It reverses direction at Gandhidham.

References 

 

Transport in Mumbai
Transport in Bhuj
Rail transport in Gujarat
Transport in Kutch district
AC Express (Indian Railways) trains
Railway services introduced in 2013
Rail transport in Maharashtra